Italian Belgians are Belgians citizens of Italian descent. The term may also refer to someone who has immigrated to Belgium from Italy.

History
The first Italians in Belgium were some Tuscan merchants and bankers of the Renaissance, and subsequently a few dozen artisans and exiles until the 18th century.

In the early 19th century, a small community of Italians began to emerge, almost all of them from the north, in the main cities of Wallonia and in Brussels. These Italians, even if a few hundred, made their influence felt in the revolts for the independence of Belgium in 1830.

A part of the Italian emigration to Belgium dedicated themselves to work in the coal mines of Wallonia, but emigration was always limited until the 20th century. It also faded in the years of fascism until it was made up of a few dozen anti-fascist exiles.

After World War II, Belgium faced a shortage of coal. This deficiency could have had consequences for its reconstruction and for the entire industrial sector. In response to the labor shortage for the coal mines, the Belgian government called on foreign workers. Since the manpower potential of Eastern Europe was no longer available, due to the division of Europe into two blocks, the Italians were called to work in the mines. 

On 23 June 1946, a memorandum of understanding was signed between Belgium and Italy, which was in a difficult social situation caused by the defeat in the Second World War. The agreement provided for the arrival of 50,000 Italians in exchange for the export to Italy of “200 kg of coal per miner per day”. However, the needs continue to increase Italian immigration increased considerably.

In the years of the conclusion of the various bilateral agreements between Italy and Belgium, such as the protocol of 23 June 1946 and the protocol of 11 December 1957, the Italian immigrants heading to the Belgian coal mines numbered around 24,000 in 1946 and 46,000 in 1948. Apart from a period of decline corresponding to the years 1950-1950, in 1961 Italians represented 44.2% of the foreign population in Belgium, reaching 200,000 people.

Between 1946 and 1948, 75,000 Italians arrived in Belgium to work in the Belgian coal mines. This number of Italians on Belgian territory continued to increase, despite the difficult living conditions and mining disasters, such as that of the Marcinelle mining disaster on 8 August 1956, where 262 workers, mostly Italians, died. As a consequence of these events, Italy suspended immigration to Belgium and began immigration by quota.

After the 1970s, when almost 300,000 Italians registered in Belgium, emigration decreased and there are currently around 290,000 Italian citizens. It should also be noted that in recent decades, with the creation and development of the European Union and NATO, which have their headquarters in Brussels, many Italian officials and employees, as well as employees of the institutional related industries (freelance professionals, lobbyists, non- government) have moved there to live with their respective families (albeit temporarily). Furthermore, there is a new migratory flow from Italy also in the tertiary sector, especially the advanced one..

Italian community
The Italian community in Belgium is very well integrated into Belgian society. The Italo-Belgians occupy roles of the utmost importance: just think of the former Queen of Belgium Paola Ruffo di Calabria or the former Prime Minister Elio Di Rupo.

According to official statistics from AIRE (Register of Italians residing abroad), in 2012 there were approximately 255,000 Italian citizens residing in Belgium (including Belgians with dual citizenship). According to data from the Italian consular registers, it appears that almost 50,000 Italians in Belgium (i.e. more than 25%) come from Sicily, followed by Apulia (9.5%), Abruzzo (7%), Campania (6.5%) and Veneto (6%).

On the other hand, there are about 450,000 (about 4% of the total Belgian population) people of Italian origin in Belgium. The community of Belgians of Italian descent is said to be 85% concentrated in Wallonia and in Brussels. More precisely, 65% of Belgians of Italian descent live in Wallonia, 20% in Brussels and 15% in the Flemish Region.

The Italian community would be the most numerous in Belgium, together with the Moroccan one, and also the oldest. The Italian community in Belgium is integrated into Belgian society. The sectors mainly occupied by Italians residing in Flanders are commerce, transport, accommodation and catering. As far as Brussels is concerned, Italians are more attracted to the administrative, social and health sector, while in Wallonia they turn more to industry and construction.

Italian press and institutions
In Belgium there are numerous institutions to protect Italian-Belgians, both for pensions and for social assistance. Twelve Italian schools, concentrated in Brussels and in Wallonia (such as the consular school office of Charleroi), are dedicated to teaching the Italian language together with institutions such as the Dante Alighieri Society.

The Italian press is very widespread. These are the main publications:
 Azione Sociale, quarterly (Genk, since 1995);
 Il Caffè, quarterly (Ghent, since 2001);
 Communitas, monthly (Brussels, since 1963);
 L'Eco del Belgio, bimonthly (Quaregnon, since 1987);
 Emigrazione Siciliana, bimonthly (Saint-Nicolas);
 L'Isola, bimonthly (Brussels, since 1999);
 Italia News, monthly (Brussels);
 Nuovi Orizzonti Europa - Belgio, bimonthly (Marchienne-au-Pont);
 Oraitalia, monthly (Brussels, since 2006);
 Qui Italia, quarterly (Brussels, since 1994).

See also

 Italian diaspora
 Belgium-Italy relations
 Immigration to Belgium

References

Bibliography
 Favero, Luigi e Tassello, Graziano. Cent'anni di emigrazione italiana (1876-1976). Cser. Roma, 1978 (in Italian).
Morelli, Anne. Gli italiani del Belgio. Storia e storie di due secoli di migrazioni. Editoriale Umbra. Foligno, 2004 (In Italian).

-
Belgium
 
Belgium